Wasa Dargah is a village in Siddharthnagar District, Uttar Pradesh, India.

See also
Ashraf Jahangir Semnani

References

External links 
 http://sidharthnagar.nic.in/0809/vill0809/vasachak/gv.pdf

Villages in Siddharthnagar district